Irina Vladimirovna Koroleva (née Zaryazhko) (born 4 October 1991) is a Russian volleyball player, who plays as a middle blocker. She is a member of the Women's National Team and has participated at the Universiade (in Kazan 2013, Gwangju 2015), the Montreux Volley Masters (in 2013, 2014, 2015), the Women's European Volleyball Championship (in 2013, 2015), the FIVB Volleyball World Grand Prix (in 2013, 2014, 2015, 2016), the 2014 FIVB Volleyball Women's World Championship in Italy, the 2015 European Games in Baku, and the 2016 Summer Olympics in Rio de Janeiro.

At club level, she played for Aouroum Khabarovsk, Samorodok Khabarovsk and Uralochka before joining Dinamo Kazan in 2016.

Awards

Individuals
 2013 Montreux Volley Masters "Best Blocker"
 2015 European Championship "Best Middle Blockers"
 2017 Yeltsin Cup "Best Blocker"
 2019 World Cup "Best blocker"

National team

Junior
 2013 Universiade –  Gold medal
 2015 Universiade –  Gold medal

Senior
 2013 Montreux Volley Masters –  Silver medal
 2013 Boris Yeltsin Cup –  Gold medal
 2013 European Championship –  Gold medal
 2014 Montreux Volley Masters –  Bronze medal
 2014 Boris Yeltsin Cup –  Silver medal
 2014 FIVB World Grand Prix –  Bronze medal
 2015 FIVB World Grand Prix –  Silver medal
 2015 European Championship –  Gold medal
 2019 World Cup -  Bronze medal (with Russia)

Clubs
 2013–14 CEV Cup –  Silver medal (with Uralochka)
 2014–15 CEV Women's Challenge Cup –  Silver medal (with Uralochka)
 2015–16 Russian Championship –  Silver medal (with Uralochka)
 2016 Russian Cup –  Gold medal (with Dinamo Kazan)
 2016–17 CEV Cup –  Gold medal (with Dinamo Kazan)
 2016–17 Russian Championship –  Silver medal (with Dinamo Kazan)
 2019 Russian Super League -  Champion, with WVC Dynamo Kazan
 2019 Russian Cup -  Champion, with WVC Dynamo Kazan
 2020 Russian Cup -  Champion, with WVC Dynamo Kazan

References

External links
FIVB Profile
Profile at CEV
Profile at Volleyball club Dinamo-Kazan

1991 births
Living people
Russian women's volleyball players
Sportspeople from Novosibirsk
European Games competitors for Russia
Volleyball players at the 2015 European Games
Olympic volleyball players of Russia
Volleyball players at the 2016 Summer Olympics
Universiade medalists in volleyball
Universiade gold medalists for Russia
Volleyball players at the 2020 Summer Olympics
20th-century Russian women
21st-century Russian women